Mitja (Demetrij) Brodar (1921 – 16 February 2012) was a Slovenian paleontologist. He was a son of Srečko Brodar, a pioneer of the study of the Paleolithic period in Slovenia. In the sixties and seventies of the 20th century Brodar, together with France Osole, was leading the Paleolithic research in Slovenia.

Life
He was born in 1921 in Celje where his father was at the time teaching science at the Grammar school in Celje.

During Italian occupation of Ljubljana in WW2 he joined the anti-Nazi resistance movement, was captured in 1942 and sent to the Italian concentration camps in Rab, Reka [Fiume] and in Visco.

Education and Work
Brodar studied civil engineering at the University of Ljubljana, at the wish of his father (graduated in 1949). Later he also studied geology and paleontology with graduation in 1953. Since 1952 he was a member of Ljubljana Cave Exploration Society (DZRJL). Between 1954 and 1956 and in 1960 he was excavating the cave Mokriška jama. He received PhD in 1959 with a thesis on those excavations. Betal Rock Shelter is another site he was excavating.

He helped establish and was during the 1970s president of the Slovene archaeological association. Together with his father he wrote a book on Potok Cave excavations.

Divje Babe flute
According to Brodar, the Divje Babe flute is a product of Cro-Magnon, modern human, and not Neanderthal.

References

1921 births
2012 deaths
Yugoslav geologists
Slovenian paleontologists
Prešeren Award laureates
University of Ljubljana alumni
People from Celje